The Eighth Lee Kuan Yew Cabinet is the eighth Cabinet of Singapore formed by Prime Minister Lee Kuan Yew. It was formed in 1989 after the 1988 Singaporean general election.

Ministers

Ministers of State and Parliamentary Secretaries

References 

Executive branch of the government of Singapore
Lists of political office-holders in Singapore
Cabinets established in 1988
Lee Kuan Yew